Namuyi (Namuzi;) is a poorly attested Tibeto-Burman and more specifically Naic language of Sichuan and Tibet. It has also been classified as Qiangic by Sun Hongkai (2001) and Guillaume Jacques (2011). The eastern and western dialects have low mutual intelligibility. In Sichuan, it is spoken in Muli County and Mianning County. The language is endangered and the number of speakers with fluency is decreasing year by year, as most teenagers do not speak the language, instead speaking the Sichuan dialect of Chinese.

Geographical distribution 
Namuyi is a language spoken in the following four villages of southern Sichuan:
 (Namuyi name): Dàshuǐ Village 大水村, Mínshèng Township 民胜鄉, Xīchāng City (80 ethnic Namuyi)
 (Namuyi name): Хiǎngshuǐ Village 響水村, Xiǎngshuǐ Township 響水鄉, Xīchāng City (800 ethnic Namuyi)
 (Namuyi name): Dōngfēng Village 東風村, Zéyuǎn, Township 澤遠鄉, Miǎnníng County (560 ethnic Namuyi)
 (Namuyi name): Lǎoyā Village 老鴉村, Shābà Town, 沙壩鎮, Miǎnníng County (290 ethnic Namuyi)

It is also spoken in Muli and Yanyuan of the Liangshan Autonomous Prefecture and Jiulong County in the Ganzi Autonomous Prefecture.

Dialects 
The Namuyi language is subdivided into two different dialects, the dialect of spoken by the people around Muli, and the dialect of those spoken in Mianning. The dialects differ mainly in phonology, where the Mianning and Yanyuan dialect have few consonant clusters as opposed to the Mianning and Xichang dialect.

Phonology 
There are 40 single-consonant initials in the Namuyi language. Namuyi also has ten phonemic vowels, /i/ for [i], /e/ for [e], /ɛ/ for [ɛ], /ɨ/ for [ʃ,ɯ] /ʉ/ for [y], /ə/ for [ə], /a/ for [a], /u/ for [u], /o/ for [o], and /ɔ/ for [ɔ]. There is no phonological vowel length, though speakers can lengthen a vowel in the first syllable at times to emphasize a word.

References

External links 
 ELAR archive of Namuyi language documentation materials

Loloish languages
Qiangic languages
Languages of China